Ben Alexander O'Connor (born 25 November 1995) is an Australian road cyclist, who currently rides for UCI WorldTeam .

Cycling career
In May 2018, he was named in the startlist for the 2018 Giro d'Italia. He was in 12th place on the general classification at the start of stage 19 but crashed during the stage breaking his collarbone. He then withdrew from the race. 

In 2019 he completed two Grand Tours, the Giro d'Italia and the Vuelta a España.
O'Connor started the 2020 Giro d'Italia. He achieved his first Grand Tour stage win on stage 17 after finishing second on stage 16 the day before.

O'Connor won stage nine of the 2021 Tour de France after getting in the breakaway and then riding solo for the last seventeen kilometres of the mountain stage. His victory elevated him to second in the general classification at the end of the stage. He finished the Tour in fourth place overall.

Major results

2015
 6th Time trial, Oceanian Under-23 Road Championships
2016
 1st  Overall New Zealand Cycle Classic
1st Stage 4
 3rd Time trial, National Under-23 Road Championships
 3rd Overall Tour de Savoie Mont-Blanc
 3rd Overall Tour de Taiwan
2017
 5th Overall Tour of Austria
1st Stage 5
 8th Overall Tour de Langkawi
2018
 7th Overall Tour of the Alps
1st  Young rider classification
1st Stage 3
 10th Trofeo Matteotti
2019
 6th Overall Tour of Austria
2020
 1st Stage 17 Giro d'Italia
 1st Stage 4 Étoile de Bessèges
2021
 4th Overall Tour de France
1st Stage 9
 Combativity award Stage 9
 4th Mont Ventoux Dénivelé Challenge
 5th Overall Tour des Alpes-Maritimes et du Var
 6th Overall Tour de Romandie
 8th Overall Critérium du Dauphiné
2022
 1st Tour du Jura
 3rd Overall Critérium du Dauphiné
 5th Overall Tour de Romandie
 6th Overall Volta a Catalunya
1st Stage 3
 6th Classic Grand Besançon Doubs
 7th Overall Vuelta a Andalucía
 8th Overall Vuelta a España
2023
 6th Overall Tour Down Under

General classification results timeline

References

External links

1995 births
Living people
Australian male cyclists
Australian people of Irish descent
Place of birth missing (living people)
Australian Tour de France stage winners
Australian Giro d'Italia stage winners
Cyclists from Perth, Western Australia
20th-century Australian people
21st-century Australian people